The Parsons Preachers were a minor league baseball team based in Parsons, Kansas that played in the Class-C Missouri Valley League in 1905, the Class-D Kansas State League in 1906 and the Class-D Oklahoma–Arkansas–Kansas League in 1907. They were the last minor league team to be based in Parsons until 1921.

Babe Adams and Charlie Rhodes played for the unaffiliated team.

References

Baseball teams established in 1905
Defunct minor league baseball teams
1905 establishments in Kansas
Defunct baseball teams in Kansas
Defunct Missouri Valley League teams
Baseball teams disestablished in 1907
Kansas State League teams